List of awards and recognitions awarded to the Lebanese singer Fairuz.

1957
 Cavalier Order Medal of Honour, awarded by Lebanese President Camille Chamoun.

1962
 Order of Merit, awarded by Lebanese President Fouad Chehab.

1963
 Medal of Honour, awarded by King Hussein of Jordan.
 Order of Cedars, awarded by Lebanese President Fouad Chehab;

1967
 Order of Merit First Class, awarded by Syrian President Nureddin al-Atassi.

1968
 Key to the Holy City, awarded by Jerusalem Cultural Committee.

1969
 Memorial Lebanese Stamp, issued by the Lebanese Government.

1970
 Legion of Honour, awarded by Lebanese President Suleiman Frangieh.

1975
 Gold Medal of Honour, awarded by King Hussein of Jordan.

1988
 Commandeur des Arts et des Lettres, awarded by French President François Mitterrand

1997
 Highest Artistic Distinction, awarded by Tunisian President Zine El Abidine Ben Ali 
 Jerusalem Award, awarded by the Jerusalem Culture and Arts Committee.

1998
 Chevalier de la Légion d'honneur, awarded by French President Jacques Chirac 
 Highest Distinction, awarded by King Hussein of Jordan

2005
Honorary Doctorate from the American University of Beirut

References 
 FairuzFan - The Web Site of Every Fairuz Fan
https://theuselessweb.com/

Fairuz